Florence Moore Hall, commonly referred to as FloMo, is an undergraduate dormitory at Stanford University. Designed by Milton Pflueger in 1956, Florence Moore Hall was initially a women's dormitory. The dorm made headlines for its cost of $2.6 million, of which $1 million was donated by Florence Moore (two other smaller nearby student houses are named after her husband, Robert S. Moore). 

The hall consists of seven three-story buildings, Alondra, Cardenal, Faisan, Gavilan, Loro, Mirlo, and Paloma (all Spanish names for birds), organized around a cafeteria, courtyard, and central offices. In addition to being connected on the first floor by the cafeteria, the seven buildings were once connected by a network of catwalks. They were removed during renovation in the summer of 2013.

Over the years, Florence Moore has flipped back and forth from having some all-female buildings and some all-male buildings, but as of 2016, all seven are co-ed. Alondra and Mirlo are freshmen-only dorms, while Cardenal, Faisan, Gavilan, Loro, and Paloma are four-class. Flo Mo, as it is known to some, is best known for its rooms' wall-to-wall windows, for its dining hall's availability of ice cream at every meal (with up to eight different flavors at any given time), and for part of East Florence Moore Hall (Cardenal and Alondra) being the site of Structured Liberal Education (SLE).

Notes

References

External links

Map: 

Florence Moore Hall